The Junkers Ju 86 was a German monoplane bomber and civilian airliner designed in the early 1930s, and employed by various air forces on both sides during World War II. The civilian model Ju 86B could carry ten passengers. Two were delivered to Swissair and five to Deutsche Luft Hansa. In addition a single civilian Ju 86Z was delivered to Sweden's AB Aerotransport.

Design and development
In 1934, a specification for a modern twin-engined aircraft, capable of operating both as a high-speed airliner for the German airline Luft Hansa and as a medium bomber for the nascent Luftwaffe, was issued to both Junkers and Heinkel. Five prototypes were ordered from each company; the Junkers Ju 86 and Heinkel He 111.

Junkers' design was a low-winged twin-engined monoplane, of all-metal stressed skin construction. Unlike most of Junkers' previous designs, it discarded the typical corrugated skinning in favour of smooth metal skinning which helped to reduce drag. The craft was fitted with a narrow track retractable-main gear conventional undercarriage with a fixed tailwheel, and twin fins and rudders. It was intended to be powered by Junkers Jumo 205 diesel engines, which although heavy, gave better fuel consumption than conventional petrol engines.

The design featured the distinctive Junkers doppelflügel control surfaces on the wing, similar to those on the Junkers Ju 52. These were hinged below the wing's trailing edge, with the outboard section on each side functioning as an aileron, and the inner section functioning as a wing flap. The bomber aircraft had a crew of four; a pilot, navigator, radio operator/bombardier and gunner. Defensive armament consisted of three machine guns, situated at the nose; at a dorsal position; and within a retractable ventral position. Bombs were carried vertically in four fuselage cells behind the cockpit. The airliner version replaced the bomb cells with seating for ten passengers, with fuel tanks being moved from the fuselage to the wings.

Jumo 205s were unavailable when the first prototype airframe was completed. Instead, the bomber-configured Ju 86ab1 was fitted with Siemens SAM 22 radial engines and flew for the first time on 4 November 1934. The second prototype, also a bomber, flew in January 1935. The third Ju 86, the first civil prototype, flew on 4 April 1935. Production of pre-series military and civil aircraft started in late 1935, with full production of the Ju 86A-1 bomber commencing in April 1936. Production quickly switched to the improved Ju 86D with a modified tail cone to improve stability.

Early use of the Jumo-powered Ju 86 bomber in the Spanish Civil War showed that it was inferior to the He 111, with the diesel engines being unsuitable for rough treatment during combat; and production plans were cut back. One Ju 86 had already been converted to use radial engines as a testbed for possible export versions, and this showed improved reliability. Production switched to a version powered by the BMW 132 engine, the Ju 86E, with production continuing until 1938.

Civil variants, introduced in 1936, were designated Ju 86Z in three different models differing in their engines. The Jumo-engined Ju 86Z-1 (corresponding to the former B-0 or C-1) was sold to Swissair (one), Airlines of Australia (one), and LAN-Chile (three). The BMW 132H-powered Ju 86Z-2 was sold to DLH (two) and the para-military Manchukuo Air Transport (five or more). The Pratt & Whitney R-1690 Hornet-engined Ju 86Z-7 was delivered to AB Aerotransport (ABA) of Sweden (one, for use as a mail carrier), Lloyd Aéreo Boliviano (three), and South African Airways - SAA - (17). The ABA aircraft was later transferred to the Swedish Air Force, with which it served, under the designation Tp 9, until 1958. South African Airways' original intention was to have its Ju 86s powered by 745 hp Rolls-Royce Kestrels. Six aircraft for SAA, flown with these engines, were refitted with Hornets before delivery, and the remainder were also Hornet-powered.

The Ju 86K was an export model, also built under license in Sweden by Saab as the B 3 with (905 hp) Bristol Mercury XIX radial engines. Several aircraft remained in service with the Swedish Air Force until 1958. A few were converted for radio interception activities.

Operational history

The bomber was field-tested in the Spanish Civil War by the Condor Legion. Four Ju 86D-1s arrived in Spain in early February 1937, but after a few sorties one of them was shot down in late February–early March 1937 by Republican fighters. A replacement aircraft was sent from Germany, but after two more were damaged in landing accidents, the remaining two aircraft were sold to the Nationalist air force, remaining in service until at least the end of the Civil War. The Ju 86 had proved to be generally inferior to the Heinkel He 111 evaluated at the same time. A single Gruppe of Ju 86 bombers (III KG 1) remained in operational service at the start of the Second World War and were used in the 1939 invasion of Poland, but replaced soon after. The diesel-engined Ju 86A and Ds were retired, while the radial-engined Ju 86E and Gs were transferred to bomber training schools. In late 1942, available aircraft, including Ju 86s, were pulled out of the training schools to reinforce the Luftwaffes transport force in its attempt to supply the German 6th Army, besieged at Stalingrad. The Ju 86s formed two transport Gruppen, equipped with 58 aircraft, operating out of Tatsinskaya Airfield. They were unsuited to the transport role, and suffered heavy losses (42 Ju 86s were lost by the end of January 1943) before being forced out of the airlift when the Soviets captured Tatsinskaya, not having the range to reach Stalingrad from the replacement airfields. The survivors returned to the training role.

In January 1940, the Luftwaffe tested the prototype  Ju 86P with a longer wingspan, pressurized cabin, Junkers Jumo 207A-1 turbocharged two-stroke, opposed-piston diesel engines and a two-man crew. The Ju 86P could fly higher than 12,000 m (39,000 ft), where it was felt to be safe from enemy fighters. The British Westland Welkin and Soviet Yakovlev Yak-9PD were developed specifically to counter this threat.

The aircraft used on the Allied side in World War II were 17 early-model units that had been in use by South African Airways. When war broke out, the planes were militarised and armed as bombers with defensive guns and external bomb racks. These aircraft were initially used for coastal patrols along with the sole Ju 86K-1, playing an important role in the interception of the German blockade runner SS Watussi in December 1939. In May 1940, they were used to re-equip No. 12 Squadron SAAF, which was deployed in the East African Campaign from June 1940. It flew its first bombing missions on 14 June 1940. As more modern aircraft became available, the South African Ju 86s were passed from squadron to squadron, seeing their last use with No. 22 Squadron SAAF, which used it along with the Avro Anson in the coastal reconnaissance role, finally retiring its Ju 86s in September 1942.

Hungary used its Ju 86s to bomb Slovakian airfields and defensive positions during the Slovak–Hungarian War in March 1939. From June 1941, Hungary's Ju 86s began to be replaced by Italian Caproni Ca.135 bombers. An independent bomber squadron, equipped with a mix of Ju 86s and Ca 135s was deployed in support of the Hungarian Gyorshadtest (or Fast Corps) during the German-led invasion of the Soviet Union, but the Ju 86 was withdrawn from front line service by Hungary during 1942.

Satisfied with the trials of the new Ju 86P prototype, the Luftwaffe ordered that some 40 older-model bombers be converted to Ju 86P-1 high-altitude bombers and Ju 86P-2 photo-reconnaissance aircraft, with pressurized fuselage, no armament, and a crew of two. Those operated successfully for some years over Britain, the Soviet Union and North Africa. During early 1941 the reconnaissance version flew sorties over Britain, but these stopped when Hitler invaded Russia (Operation Barbarossa). By mid-1942 the pressurized bomber version was available, and flew about a dozen nuisance raids over southern England. After the RAF mounted a special interception squadron using modified Spitfire Mk IXs, and one bomber attempting a raid on Portsmouth was intercepted on 12 September 1942, no further flights over England were attempted.

In August 1942, a modified Supermarine Spitfire V shot one down over Egypt at an altitude of some 14,500 m (49,000 ft); when two more were lost, Ju 86Ps were withdrawn from service in 1943.

Junkers developed the Ju 86R for the Luftwaffe, using larger wings and new engines capable of even higher altitudes - up to 16,000 m (52,500 ft) - but production was limited to prototypes.

Surviving aircraft

Only one Junkers Ju 86 is known to exist today. The aircraft was built in Germany and sold to Sweden in 1938. Before it was retired from Swedish service in 1958, the aircraft was used in the 1955 movie Des Teufels General. It is on permanent static display at the Swedish Air Force Museum near Linköping.

Variants
Ju 86abl
First bomber prototype.
Ju 86bal
Second transport prototype.
Ju 86cb
Third bomber prototype.
Ju 86V4
Prototype for the Ju 86B commercial transport aircraft.
Ju 86V5
Prototype for the Ju 86A bomber aircraft.
Ju 86A-0
13 pre-production bomber aircraft.
Ju 86A-1
Initial bomber version.
Ju 86B-0
Seven pre-production transport aircraft.
Ju 86C-1
Six transport aircraft for Deutsche Luft Hansa, powered by two Junkers Jumo 205C diesel engines.
Ju 86D-1
Bomber version.
Ju 86E-1
Bomber version for the Luftwaffe, powered by two BMW 132F radial engines.
Ju 86E-2
Powered by two BMW 132N radials.

Ju 86G-1
Fitted with a round glass nose.
Ju 86E-2
Uprated version of the Ju 86E-1.
Ju 86K-1
Export version for South Africa and Sweden.

Ju 86K-2
Export version for Hungary.
Ju 86K-4
Export version for Sweden, similar to the Ju 86K-1, but fitted with two Bristol Pegasus III radials.
Ju 86K-5
Swedish-built bomber aircraft, powered by two Swedish-built Bristol Pegasus XII radials.
Ju 86K-6
Export version for Chile
Ju 86K-7
Export version for Austria and Portugal with BMW 132 radials.
Ju 86K-13
Swedish-built bomber aircraft, fitted with Swedish or Polish-built Pegasus engines.
Ju 86P-1
High-altitude bomber version, fitted with two Jumo 207 diesel engines and with turbochargers.
Ju 86P-2
High-altitude photo reconnaissance version, still equipped for bombing. Same engines as P-1.
Ju 86R-1
High-altitude photo reconnaissance version. Retained Jumo 207 engines.
Ju 86R-2
High-altitude bomber version.
Ju 86R-3
Powered by two Jumo 208 engines.
Ju 86Z series
Civil export models
Ju 186
Proposed four-engined high-altitude bomber aircraft. Not built.
Ju 286
Proposed six-engined high-altitude bomber aircraft. Not built.
K 85
Proposed torpedo bomber version for the Swedish Air Force.

Operators

Military operators 
Austria
Austrian Air Force
Bolivia
Bolivian Air Force
Chile
Chilean Air Force
Germany
Luftwaffe
Hungary
Royal Hungarian Air Force
Portugal
Portuguese Air Force
Romania
Romanian Air Force
South Africa
South African Air Force The SAAF operated 18 aircraft namely 17 Ju 86Z and one Ju 86K (from South African Airways). These aircraft were operated by 12 and 16 Squadron.
Spain
Spanish Air Force
Sweden
Swedish Air Force

Civil operators
Australia
Southern Airlines and Freighters of Australia
Bolivia
Lloyd Aéreo Boliviano
Chile
LAN Chile
Germany
Deutsche Luft Hansa
Manchukuo (Manchuria)

Manchukuo National Airways
South Africa
South African Airways
Spanish State
Iberia Airlines
Sweden
AB Aerotransport
Switzerland
Swissair

Specifications (Ju 86 R-1)

See also

Notes

Bibliography

 Bridgeman, Leonard. "The Junkers Ju 86P and Ju 86R." Jane's Fighting Aircraft of World War II. London: Studio, 1946. .
 Dressel, Joachim and Manfred Griehl. Bombers of the Luftwaffe. London: Arms and Armour Press, 1994, .

 Green, William. War Planes of the Second World War: Volume Ten Bombers and Reconnaissance Aircraft. London: Macdonald, 1968.
 Green, William and Gordon Swanborough. "Junkers Ju 86 ... The Dimorphus Dessauer". Air Enthusiast, Number Twenty, December 1982-March 1983, pp. 15–30. Bromley, UK: Pilot Press. 
 Hooton, E. R. War Over the Steppes: The Air Campaigns on the Eastern Front 1941–45. Oxford: Osprey Publishing, 2016. . 
 James, Derek N. Westland: A History. Gloucestershire, UK: Tempus Publishing Ltd., 2002. .
 Smith, J.R. and Antony L. Kay. German Aircraft of the Second World War, London: Putnam, 1972. .
 Stroud, John. European Transport Aircraft since 1910. London: Putnam, 1966.
 Sundgren, Anita. Flygvapenmuseum: The Swedish Air Force Museum. Linköping, Sweden: Edita Västra Aros AB, 2011. .

External links

Photo gallery of Junkers Ju 86K-4
WW II German operating manual for Ju 86 G-1
WW II German manual for Ju 86 P-1

1930s German airliners
1930s German bomber aircraft
1940s German military reconnaissance aircraft
World War II medium bombers of Germany
Ju 086
Diesel-engined aircraft
Low-wing aircraft
Aircraft first flown in 1934
Twin piston-engined tractor aircraft